The politics of Zambia takes place in a framework of a presidential representative democratic republic, whereby the president of Zambia is head of state, head of government and leader of a multi-party system. Executive power is exercised by the government, while legislative power is vested in both the government and parliament. Formerly Northern Rhodesia, Zambia became a republic immediately upon attaining independence in October 1964.

Whilst Zambia has since functioned as a democracy from independence it soon became a one-party state for 19 years from 8 December 1972 until multi-party democracy was re-introduced on 4 December 1990 which led to multi-party elections on 1 November 1991. Since then, Zambia has been a relatively stable democracy having consistently peacefully transferred power between four political parties (UNIP, MMD, PF and UPND) and has since 1991 held nine presidential elections, of which seven were general elections.

The Economist Intelligence Unit (EIU) rated Zambia as a hybrid regime in 2020. The EIU has also consistently put Zambia among the top ten most democratic African countries, ranking it 8th in Africa and 99th in the world as of 2018 (167 states). This is also while Freedom House ranks Zambia as ‘Partly Free’, with a score of 52/100 (0 least free and 100 mostly free) as of 2021.

Government and constitution 

The constitution promulgated on August 25, 1973, abrogated the original 1964 constitution. The new constitution and the national elections that followed in December 1973 were the final steps in achieving what was called a "one-party participatory democracy".

The 1973 constitution provided for a strong president and a unicameral National Assembly. National policy was formulated by the Central Committee of the United National Independence Party (UNIP), the sole legal party in Zambia. The cabinet executed the central committee's policy.

In accordance with the intention to formalise UNIP supremacy in the new system, the constitution stipulated that the sole candidate in elections for the office of president was the person selected to be the president of UNIP by the party's general conference. The second-ranking person in the Zambian hierarchy was UNIP's secretary-general.

In December 1990, at the end of a tumultuous year that included riots in the capital and an attempted coup, President Kaunda signed legislation ending UNIP's monopoly on power. In response to growing popular demand for multiparty democracy, and after lengthy, difficult negotiations between the Kaunda government and opposition groups, Zambia enacted a new constitution in August 1991. The constitution enlarged the National Assembly from 136 members to a maximum of 158 members, established an electoral commission, and allowed for more than one presidential candidate who no longer had to be a member of UNIP. The constitution was amended again in 1996 to set new limits on the presidency (including a retroactive two-term limit, and a requirement that both parents of a candidate be Zambian-born). The National Assembly comprises 150 directly elected members, up to ten (usually eight) presidentially appointed members, and a speaker. Zambia is divided into ten provinces, each administered by an appointed Provincial minister who essentially performs the duties of a governor.

As of 2010, a new constitution is in the process of being drafted.

Political history 

The major figure in Zambian politics from 1964 to 1991 was Kenneth Kaunda, who led the fight for independence and successfully bridged the rivalries among the country's various regions and ethnic groups. Kaunda tried to base government on his philosophy of "humanism", which condemned human exploitation and stressed cooperation among people, but not at the expense of the individual. During Kaunda's presidency, members of all ethnic groups were represented by ministers in the government, in relation to their demographic size.

Kaunda's political party, the United National Independence Party (UNIP), was founded in 1959 and was in power under Kaunda's leadership from 1964 to 1991. Before 1972, Zambia had three significant political parties: UNIP, the Northern Rhodesian African National Congress, and the United Progressive Party (UPP). The ANC drew its strength from western and southern provinces, while the UPP found some support among Bemba speakers in the copperbelt and northern provinces. Although not strongly supported in all areas of the country, only UNIP had a nationwide following.

One-party state
In February 1972, Zambia became a one-party state, and all other political parties were banned. Kenneth Kaunda, the sole candidate, was elected president in the 1973 elections. Elections also were held for the National Assembly. Only UNIP members were permitted to run, but these seats were sharply contested. President Kaunda's mandate was renewed in December 1978 and October 1983 in a "yes" or "no" vote on his candidacy. In the 1983 election, more than 60% of those registered participated and gave President Kaunda a 93% "yes" vote.

1991: Move to a multiparty state
Growing opposition to UNIP's monopoly on power led to the rise in 1990 of the Movement for Multiparty Democracy (MMD). The MMD assembled an increasingly impressive group of important Zambians, including prominent UNIP defectors and labour leaders. During the year, President Kaunda agreed to a referendum on the one-party state but, in the face of continued opposition, dropped the referendum and signed a constitutional amendment making Zambia a multi-party state. Zambia's first multi-party elections for parliament and the presidency since the 1960s were held on October 31, 1991. MMD candidate Frederick Chiluba resoundingly carried the presidential election over Kenneth Kaunda with 76% of the vote. To add to the MMD landslide, in the parliamentary elections the MMD won 125 of the 150 elected seats and UNIP the remaining 25. However, UNIP swept the Eastern Province, gathering 19 of its seats there.

1991–2001: MMD and Frederick Chiluba
By the end of Chiluba's first term as president (1996), the MMD's commitment to political reform had faded in the face of re-election demands. A number of prominent supporters founded opposing parties. Relying on the MMD's overwhelming majority in parliament, President Chiluba in May 1996 pushed through constitutional amendments that eliminated former President Kaunda and other prominent opposition leaders from the 1996 presidential elections.

In the presidential and parliamentary elections held in November 1996, Chiluba was re-elected, and the MMD won 131 of the 150 seats in the National Assembly. Kaunda's UNIP party boycotted the parliamentary polls to protest the exclusion of its leader from the presidential race, alleging in addition that the outcome of the election had been predetermined due to a faulty voter registration exercise. Despite the UNIP boycott, the elections took place peacefully, and five presidential and more than 600 parliamentary candidates from 11 parties participated. Afterward, however, several opposition parties and non-governmental organisations declared the elections neither free nor fair. As President Chiluba began his second term in 1997, the opposition continued to reject the results of the election amid international efforts to encourage the MMD and the opposition to resolve their differences through dialogue.

Early in 2001, supporters of President Chiluba mounted a campaign to amend the constitution to enable Chiluba to seek a third term of office. Civil society, opposition parties, and many members of the ruling party complimented widespread popular opposition to exert sufficient pressure on Chiluba to force him to back away from any attempt at a third term.

Presidential, parliamentary, and local government elections were held on December 27, 2001. Eleven parties contested the elections. The elections encountered numerous administrative problems. Opposition parties alleged that serious irregularities occurred. Nevertheless, MMD presidential candidate Levy Mwanawasa was declared the victor by a narrow margin, and he was sworn into office on January 2, 2002. Three parties submitted petitions to the High Court, challenging the presidential election results. The courts decided that there had been irregularities but that they were not serious enough to have affected the overall result, thus the election result was upheld. Opposition parties won a majority of parliamentary seats in the December, 2001 election, but subsequent by-elections gave the ruling MMD a slim majority in Parliament.

2001–2008
In the 2006 presidential election was hotly contested, with Mwanawasa being re-elected by a clear margin over principal challengers Michael Sata of the Patriotic Front and Hakainde Hichilema of the United Party for National Development (UPND).

The parliamentary election that same year awarded MMD with 72 seats, the remaining 84 seats split among other parties with the majority of those seats going to the Patriotic Front.

The presidency of Levy Mwanawasa until his death in office in mid-2008, was different from the flamboyant expenditure and increasingly apparent corruption of the later years of Frederick Chiluba's terms in office. Indeed, the former president was arrested and charged with several counts of embezzlement and corruption, firmly quashing initial fears that President Mwanawasa would turn a blind eye to the allegations of his predecessor's improprieties.

Mwanawasa was accused by some observers of demonstrating an authoritarian streak in early 2004 when his Minister of Home Affairs issued a deportation order to a British citizen and long-time Zambian resident Roy Clarke, who had published a series of satirical attacks on the president in the independent Post newspaper. However, when Clarke appealed to the High Court against the order, the judge ruled that the order was arbitrary and unjustified and quashed the order. President Mwanawasa, true to his mantra of heading a government of laws, respected the court decision and Clarke was allowed to resume his column of satirical critique. Mwanawasa's early zeal to root out corruption also waned somewhat, with key witnesses in the Chiluba trial leaving the country. The Constitutional Review Commission set up by Mwanawasa also hit some turbulence, with arguments as to where its findings should be submitted leading to suspicions that he has been trying to manipulate the outcome. Generally, the Zambian electorate viewed Mwanawasa's rule as a great improvement over Chiluba's.

Following Mwanawasa's death in August 2008, Zambian vice-president Rupiah Banda succeeded him to the office of president, to be held as a temporary position until the emergency election on October 30, 2008. Banda won by a narrow margin over opposition leader Michael Sata, to complete the remainder of Mwanawasa's term.

2011 elections
Rupiah Banda failed to be re-elected in the 2011 Presidential and Parliamentary elections, losing to Michael Sata of the Patriotic Front. This brought an end to a total of 20 years' rule by three presidents from the MMD.

2015–present
Edgar Chagwa Lungu was sworn in as president of Zambia on January 25, 2015, succeeding acting-president Guy Scott who briefly held the office after the passing of Michael Chiluyfa Sata. Lungu's presidency has thus far been criticised for failing to halt the depreciating Kwacha. There have also been unsubstantiated reports of Lungu's alleged alcoholism, stemming from a reported physical collapse early in his presidency. The economic challenges facing Zambia, in particular the depreciating Kwacha, have been attributed to the global fall of commodity prices. Zambia derives over 90% of its export earnings from a single commodity, copper, which has lost about 45% of its value on the international commodity market.

On 5 January 2016, Lungu successfully concluded long-standing constitutional issues when he assented to the 2015 Constitutional Amendment Bill. This bill is the result of extensive work begun during the Mwanawasa era (The Mwanakatwe Commission) and continued by the Michael Chilufya Sata appointed Technical Committee. As justice minister, Lungu had previously presented the draft constitution to parliament, where it was subsequently decided that non-contentious issues will be debated in parliament and contentious issues will be subject to a referendum. In the August 2016 Zambian general election, President Edgar Lungu won re-election narrowly in the first round of the election. The opposition had allegations of fraud and the governing Patriotic Front (PF) rejected the allegations made by opposition UPND party. However, in 2020 the Parliament through the office of the justice minister (Given Lubinda) proposed a bill called Bill 10, which was rejected in Parliament on its third reading.

In the 2021 general elections, characterised by a 70% voter turnout, Hakainde Hichilema won 59% of the vote, with his closest rival, incumbent president Edgar Chagwa Lungu, receiving 39% of the vote. On 16 August Edgar Lungu conceded in a TV statement, sending a letter and congratulating president-elect Hakainde Hichilema. On 24 August 2021, Hakainde Hichilema was sworn in as the new President of Zambia.

Executive branch 
The executive branch of the Zambian government is vested in the president who is elected in a two round system. Presidents serve terms of five years and are limited to two terms.

Prior to the 2016 Constitutional Amendment the Zambian vice-president was appointed by the president, but the current 2016 amendment puts the vice-president on the same electoral ticket as the president (running mate) (Article 110 Sec 2, 3 and 4) and in the event of a vacancy of an elected president the vice-president is the immediate successor to the president and remains president until the next general election (Article 106 Sec 5(a) and Sec 6). This is in contrast to the 1996 constitution that required a by-election within 90 days of an elected president's vacancy with the vice-president acting as an interim (as was the case with former Acting-President Guy Scott in October 2014 to January 2015 and former President Rupiah Banda in 2008 after the deaths of Presidents Sata and Mwanawasa respectfully).

The presidency is currently filled by Hakainde Hichilema with Mutale Nalumango as vice-president since 2021.

Legislative branch 

The unicameral National Assembly of Zambia is the country's legislative body. The current National Assembly, formed following elections held on 12 August 2021, has a total of 167 members. 156 members are directly elected in single-member constituencies using the simple majority (or First-past-the-post) system. 8 seats are filled through presidential appointment, and 3 seats are held by ex-officio members: the Vice President, the Speaker and one Deputy Speaker. All members serve five-year terms.

Political parties and elections

Presidential elections

Parliamentary elections

Judicial branch 

The Supreme Court is the highest court and the court of appeal; below it are the high court, magistrate's court, and local courts. A separate Constitutional Court was established in 2016.

Military 

The Zambian Defense Force (ZDF) consists of the army, the air force, and the Zambian National Service (ZNS). The ZDF is designed primarily for external defence. The Zambian Police force is not part of the defence force, it was established for internal security services and is under the ministry of home affairs.

Foreign relations 

Zambia is a member of the Non-Aligned Movement (NAM), the Commonwealth, the African Union (and its predecessor the Organization of African Unity or OAU), the Southern African Development Community (SADC), and the Common Market for Africa (COMA), which is headquartered in Lusaka.

President Kaunda was a persistent and visible advocate of change in Southern Africa, supporting liberation movements in Mozambique, Namibia, Southern Rhodesia (Zimbabwe), and South Africa. Many of these organisations were based in Zambia during the 1970s and 1980s.

President Chiluba assumed a somewhat higher profile internationally in the mid- and late 1990s. His government played a constructive regional role sponsoring Angola peace talks that led to the 1994 Lusaka Protocols. Zambia has provided troops to UN peacekeeping initiatives in Mozambique, Rwanda, Angola, and Sierra Leone. Zambia was the first African state to cooperate with the International Criminal Tribunal for Rwanda into the Rwandan genocide in 1994.

In 1998, Zambia took the lead in efforts to establish a cease-fire in the Democratic Republic of Congo. Zambia was active in the Congolese peace effort after the signing of a cease-fire agreement in Lusaka in July and August 1999, although activity diminished considerably after the Joint Military Commission tasked with implementing the ceasefire relocated to Kinshasa in September 2001.

Zambia is also a member of the International Criminal Court with a Bilateral Immunity Agreement of protection for the US-military (as covered under Article 98).

Participation in international organisations
Zambia is a member of ACP, AfDB, COMESA, ECA, FAO, G-19, G-77, IAEA, IBRD, ICAO, ICCt, ICFTU, ICRM, IDA, IFAD, IFC, IFRCS, ILO, IMF, Interpol, IOC, IOM, ITU, MONUC, NAM, OAU, OPCW, PCA, SADC, UN, UNAMSIL, UNCTAD, UNESCO, UNIDO, UNMEE, UNMIK, UPU, WCL, WCO, WHO, WIPO, WMO, WToO and the WTO.

References

External links 

 Zambian Politics News